Stephen Wakeling (born 4 October 1983) is an English Middleweight Muay Thai kickboxer, fighting out of Kent, England. He is former British, European and four time World Muay Thai champion.

Early life
Wakeling's parents were both Muay Thai fighters, his father competed in the famed King's Cup in Thailand.

Biography and career
He was expected to face Joe Schilling at Glory 5: London in London, England on 23 March 2013 but his opponent was changed to Simon Marcus. Marcus then withdrew from the bout to face Artem Levin, however, and Eddie Walker stepped in as his third opponent. He stopped Walker with low kicks in round two.

He was set to compete in the four man 85 kg/187 lb tournament at Glory 10: Los Angeles - Middleweight World Championship Tournament in Ontario, California, United States on 28 September 2013 and face Joe Schilling in the semi-finals. However, he was unable to compete due to visa issues and was replaced by Kengo Shimizu.

Titles
 2011 WBC Muay Thai Super Middleweight World champion
 2008 WMC M.A.D. World champion
 2007 WKA Tournament World Middleweight Champion
 2006 WBC Muay Thai Middleweight World champion
 2005 S-1 Tournament World champion
 2004 IMKO World champion
 2003 WMC Muay Thai World champion
 2003 WAKO-PRO World title (68 kg)
 2002 IKF Super Welterweight European Champion
 2001 British champion

Fight record 

|-
|-  bgcolor="#FFBBBB"
| 2017-9-22|| Loss ||align=left| Cheick Sidibé || Phoenix 3 London || London, United Kingdom || TKO || 4 || 3:00
|-  bgcolor="#CCFFCC" 
| 2013-03-23 || Win ||align=left| Eddie Walker || Glory 5: London || London, England || KO || 2 || 
|-
|-  bgcolor="#c5d2ea"
| 2012-07-07 || Draw ||align=left| Artem Levin || Xplosion Muay Thai || England || Draw || 5 || 3:00
|-
|-  bgcolor="#CCFFCC" 
| 2011-01-08 || Win ||align=left| Jaochalam Chatkranokgym||  The Champions Club 6 || Pattaya, Thailand|| TKO (Knee) || 4 || 
|-
! style=background:white colspan=9 |

|-  style="background:#CCFFCC;" 
| 2008-08-16 || Win ||align=left|  Diesellek TopkingBoxing || Muaythai Legends - England vs Thailand || London, UK || Decision || 5 || 3:00 

|-  bgcolor="#CCFFCC"
| 2007-12-08 || Win ||align=left| Yohan Lidon || Steko's Fight Night Final || Munich, Germany || Decision (Split) || 4 || 3:00
|-
|-  bgcolor="#CCFFCC"
| 2007-12-08 || Win ||align=left| Luis Reis || Steko's Fight Night Semi Final || Munich, Germany || Decision  || 3 || 3:00
|-
|-  bgcolor="#CCFFCC"
| 2007-12-08 || Win ||align=left|  Odjeh Manda || Steko's Fight Night Quarter Final || Munich, Germany || KO || 1 || 

|-  bgcolor="#CCFFCC"
| 2007-09-15 || Win ||align=left| Jan De Keyser || Steko's Fight Night, Final || Munich, Germany ||  ||  ||

|-  bgcolor="#CCFFCC"
| 2007-09-15 || Win ||align=left| Yohan Lidon || Steko's Fight Night, Semi Final || Munich, Germany || TKO(Doctor Stoppage) || 2 ||
|-
|-  bgcolor="#FFBBBB"
| 2007-02-25 || Loss ||align=left| Lamsongkram Chuwattana || Thunder & Lightning 10 || London, England  || Decision || 5 || 3:00
|-
! style=background:white colspan=9 |

|-  style="background:#CCFFCC;" 
| 2006-08-19 || Win ||align=left| Jomhod Kiatadisak || Muaythai Legends - England vs Thailand || London, UK || Decision || 5 || 3:00 
|-
|-  bgcolor="#CCFFCC" 
| 2006-03-12 || Win ||align=left| John Wayne Parr || WBC Muay Thai Championships || London, England, UK || Decision (Split) || 5 || 3:00
|-
! style=background:white colspan=9 |
|-
|-  style="background:#cfc;"
| 2005-08-12 || Win ||align=left| Pairot Wor.Wolapon || S-1 World Championship, Final || Bangkok, Thailand || KO (Knee to the head)|| 3 ||
|-
! style=background:white colspan=9 |

|-  style="background:#cfc;"
| 2005-08-12 || Win ||align=left| Arslan Magomedov || S-1 World Championship, Semi Final || Bangkok, Thailand || Decision || 3 || 3:00

|-  style="background:#cfc;"
| 2005-08-12 || Win ||align=left| Sergey Makogonov || S-1 World Championship, Quarter Final || Bangkok, Thailand || Decision || 3 || 3:00

|-  bgcolor="#CCFFCC" 
| 2004-11-14 || Win ||align=left| Abdoul Toure || Last Man Standing|| London, England, UK || TKO (Doctor Stoppage) ||  || 

|-  bgcolor="#CCFFCC" 
| 2004-10-02 || Win ||align=left| Aree Nadir ||  Muay Thai Warriors 3|| Crawley, England, UK || TKO  || 1 || 
|-
! style=background:white colspan=9 |

|-  bgcolor="#fbb" 
| 2003-06-22 || Loss||align=left| Kevin Harper || Now is the Time of Combat|| London, England, UK || TKO (Injury) || 1 || 
|-
! style=background:white colspan=9 |

|-  bgcolor="#CCFFCC" 
| 2003-02-17 || Win ||align=left| Yingyai Jaothaleethong || || London, England, UK || Decision (Split) || 5 || 3:00
|-
! style=background:white colspan=9 |

|-  bgcolor="#cfc" 
| 2002- || Win ||align=left| Kevin Harper || || England, UK || TKO (Doctor Stoppage) ||  || 

|-  bgcolor="#CCFFCC" 
| 2002-08-18 || Win ||align=left| Junior Herbert || || Reading, England, UK || Decision (Unanimous) || 5 || 3:00
|-
! style=background:white colspan=9 |
|-
| colspan=9 | Legend:

See also
List of male kickboxers

References

External links 
 Scorpions Muay Thai Boxing Gym

1983 births
Living people
English male kickboxers
Welterweight kickboxers
Middleweight kickboxers
English Muay Thai practitioners
Sportspeople from London